Prof N Thombi Singh (born at Uripok, Imphal District, Manipur, 2 February 1927) was member of 5th Lok Sabha from Inner Manipur (Lok Sabha constituency) in Manipur, India.

He was elected to 6th, 8th and 9th Lok Sabha from Inner Manipur.

References

1939 births
Living people
India MPs 1984–1989
India MPs 1989–1991
India MPs 1971–1977
India MPs 1977–1979
Manipur politicians
People from Imphal
Lok Sabha members from Manipur